The 2010 season was the Buffalo Bills'  51st season in the National Football League, It was Buffalo's first season with Buddy Nix in the role of general manager and head coach Chan Gailey. The Bills hoped to improve on their 6–10 record from the 2009 season, and attempt to make the playoffs for the first time since 1999. The Bills had the 9th pick in the first round of the 2010 NFL Draft selecting C. J. Spiller, a running back from Clemson. This season marks the first 0–8 start since 1984, in which they finished 2–14. They were eliminated from playoff contention in Week 12, extending their playoff drought to 11 seasons. Despite the poor start, Buffalo became largely competitive after the bye in Week 9. Their next four losses were by only three points each, all to teams that made the playoffs that year—Baltimore, Kansas City, Chicago and Pittsburgh (three of these losses went to overtime). The Bills eventually won four of their final eight games, which carried over into a strong start to the 2011 season. The 2010 season was marked by the emergence of wide receiver Stevie Johnson, who gained 1,073 receiving yards and nose tackle Kyle Williams, an All-Pro in 2010 who gained status as an elite defensive tackle.

Offseason
The Bills had fired head coach Dick Jauron after Week 10 of the 2009 season; he had been replaced on an interim basis by defensive coordinator Perry Fewell. The remainder of the Jauron coaching staff was released at the end of the year, including Fewell. Former Dallas Cowboys and Georgia Tech head coach Chan Gailey was hired as the Bills' new head coach and Buddy Nix had taken over as general manager after a two-year vacancy in the position. (Current team CEO Russ Brandon had handled GM responsibilities.) Gailey installed the 3-4 defense (although the team would play in a 4–3 on certain downs) and the "Pistol" offensive formation. George Edwards was named defensive coordinator, and though Gailey stated he would call the offensive plays, Curtis Modkins was named the nominal offensive coordinator. On February 18, 2010, starting right tackle Brad Butler announced his retirement from professional football. Butler suffered a season ending (ultimately a career ending) knee injury vs. the Tampa Bay Buccaneers in week 2 of the 2009 season. The Bills held an open competition for the starting quarterback position between Trent Edwards, Ryan Fitzpatrick and Brian Brohm during training camp. Edwards was named starter prior to the first preseason game, but was released from the team after two poor performances. Fitzpatrick took over in Week 3 and, in 13 games, became the first Bills quarterback to throw for 3,000 passing yards in a season since J. P. Losman in 2006.

2010 Draft

In-season transactions

Come week three Fitzpatrick was named starter against the Patriots as Edwards was benched. In the game Fitzpatrick had surpassed Edwards' statistics for the first two games. This resulted in Edwards' release from the roster the following day on Monday, a day after the game, when his success in the preseason did not continue into the first two games of the regular season. He was picked up by the Jacksonville Jaguars off waivers the next day on Tuesday.

Similarly, Marshawn Lynch was one of the starting running backs at the beginning of the regular season. He was only to be traded to the Seattle Seahawks after four games into the regular season with the rise of running backs Fred Jackson and first-round draft pick C. J. Spiller created a logjam. The draft picks were at first undisclosed. It was later announced that the Bills would receive a fourth-round draft pick in the 2011 draft and a conditional pick in the 2012 draft.

Staff

Final roster

Schedule

Preseason
The Bills preseason schedule was announced on March 31, 2010. The second preseason game, against the Indianapolis Colts, was held at the Rogers Centre in Toronto as part of the Bills Toronto Series.

Regular season
Football statistics site Football Outsiders calculates that the Bills had the toughest schedule in the league in 2010, based on strength of opponent, whilst Pro Football Reference argues that the 2010 Bills had the toughest schedule for any NFL team since 1971, with nine games against opponents 10–6 or better. Apart from their AFC East division games, the Bills played against the AFC North and NFC North according to the conference rotation, and played the Chiefs and Jaguars based on 2009 divisional positions.

Though the Bills were the last team to record their first win in 2010, starting the season with eight consecutive losses, they improved greatly in the second half of the season, with a record of 4–4 to finish the year. Nine of the Bills' twelve losses were to teams that qualified for the postseason, including both representatives in Super Bowl XLV – Pittsburgh and Green Bay. Six of the twelve losses were by eight points or less. Four Buffalo losses had a margin of three points or less and three losses were in overtime, all to eventual playoff teams (Week 7 at Baltimore, Week 8 at Kansas City and Week 12 vs. Pittsburgh).

Standings

Conference

Regular season results

Week 1: vs. Miami Dolphins

The Buffalo Bills began their season at home with an AFC East duel with the Miami Dolphins. In the 1st quarter, Buffalo trailed early when Dolphins kicker Dan Carpenter nailed a 32-yard field goal. The deficit was increased in the 2nd quarter when running back Ronnie Brown got a 1-yard TD run. The Bills eventually replied when kicker Rian Lindell made a 51-yard field goal.

In the 4th quarter, Miami increased their lead with Carpenter hitting a 43-yard field goal. Buffalo replied with a touchdown pass from quarterback Trent Edwards making a 31-yard touchdown pass to wide receiver Roscoe Parrish. The final score was made when long snapper Garrison Sanborn snapped the ball to Brian Moorman out of bounds for a safety, giving the Dolphins 2 more points and the Bills a loss.

With the loss, the Bills began at 0–1.

Week 2: at Green Bay Packers

Hoping to rebound from their loss to the Dolphins, the Bills flew to Lambeau Field for an interconference duel with the Packers. In the 1st quarter Buffalo trailed early as kicker Mason Crosby made a 44 and a 24-yard field goal, followed by RB Brandon Jackson getting a 1-yard TD run. The Bills made their only score of the game in the 2nd quarter when RB Fred Jackson made a 3-yard TD run. In the third quarter the Bills struggled further when QB Aaron Rodgers completed a 7-yard TD pass to WR Donald Driver, followed by Rodgers scrambling 9 yards to the endzone for a touchdown. The Packers increased their lead in the fourth when Rodgers made a 30-yard touchdown pass to WR James Jones.

With the loss, Buffalo fell to 0–2.

Week 3: at New England Patriots

Still looking for a win the Bills flew to Gillette Stadium for an AFC East rivalry match against the Patriots. In the first quarter Buffalo took the early lead when kicker Rian Lindell nailed a 39-yard field goal. Then they fell behind when QB Tom Brady made a 7-yard TD pass to WR Randy Moss. The Bills replied in the second quarter with Lindell making another 39-yard field goal, which was followed by QB Ryan Fitzpatrick getting a 5-yard TD pass to RB C. J. Spiller. The Patriots replied and took the narrow lead when Danny Woodhead made a 22-yard TD run. The Bills got the lead back when Lindell made a 34-yard field goal, which didn't last very long after kicker Stephen Gostkowski kicked a 43-yard field goal. The Bills fell further behind in the third quarter when Brady found Moss again on a 35-yard TD pass, but straight after the PAT, Buffalo scored when C. J. Spiller returned a kickoff and ran 95 yards to the endzone for a touchdown. The Patriots increased their narrow lead when Brady made a 5-yard TD pass to TE Rob Gronkowski, followed in the fourth quarter by RB BenJarvis Green-Ellis getting a 7-yard TD run. The Bills tried to come back into the game when Fitzpatrick made a 37-yard touchdown pass to WR Stevie Johnson, but the Patriots defense prevented anything else from happening, giving the Bills a loss and their 14th straight vs. the Patriots.

With the loss, Buffalo fell to 0–3. The next day Trent Edwards was released. He was picked up by the Jacksonville Jaguars off wavers the next day.

Week 4: vs. New York Jets

Still looking for their first win of the season, the Bills went home, donned their throwback uniforms, and played a Week 4 AFC East duel with the New York Jets.  Buffalo would trail early in the first quarter as Jets running back LaDainian Tomlinson got a 1-yard touchdown run.  New York would add onto their lead in the second quarter as kicker Nick Folk nailed a 19-yard field goal, followed by quarterback Mark Sanchez completing a 41-yard touchdown pass to wide receiver Braylon Edwards.  Buffalo would close out the half as quarterback Ryan Fitzpatrick connected with tight end David Martin on a 4-yard touchdown pass.

In the third quarter, the Jets would greatly extend their lead with tight end Dustin Keller catching a 3-yard touchdown pass from wide receiver/quarterback Brad Smith, followed by his 2-yard touchdown reception from Sanchez.  Afterwards, Tomlinson would help secure the win for New York with his 26-yard touchdown run.  The Bills would close out the game in the fourth quarter as Fitzpatrick completed a 13-yard touchdown pass to wide receiver Stevie Johnson.

With the loss, Buffalo fell to 0–4. Two days later, Marshawn Lynch was traded to the Seattle Seahawks in exchange for a fourth-round draft pick in the 2011 draft and a conditional pick in the 2012 draft, and tackle Jamon Meredith was waived.

Week 5: vs. Jacksonville Jaguars

Still looking for a win the Bills played on home ground for an AFC duel with the Jaguars. In the first quarter the Bills took the lead as QB Ryan Fitzpatrick made a 45-yard TD pass to WR Lee Evans; followed by kicker Rian Lindell making a 29-yard field goal. The Jaguars replied with kicker Josh Scobee nailing a 49-yard field goal, but in the second quarter the lead had expanded again with Lindell's 22-yard field goal. After that, the Jaguars rallied with Scobee getting another 49-yard field goal, then QB David Garrard made a 1-yard TD pass to TE Marcedes Lewis; followed in the third quarter by Garrard again finding Lewis on a 27-yard TD pass. Buffalo re-tied the game with Fitzpatrick completing a 5-yard TD pass to WR Stevie Johnson, but the Jaguars pulled away with Garrard making a 7-yard TD pass to WR Mike Sims-Walker, followed in the fourth quarter by Scobee making a 34, 40 and a 46-yard field goal. Buffalo tried to tie the game with Fitzpatrick making a 7-yard TD pass to Johnson, but with a failed 2-point conversion, it became a 2-possession game which in turn became very difficult for Buffalo to recover.

With the loss, Buffalo entered their bye week with their first 0–5 start since 1985.

Week 7: at Baltimore Ravens

Still looking for a win the Bills flew to M&T Bank Stadium for an AFC duel against the Ravens. In the 1st quarter the Bills trailed early as kicker Billy Cundiff made a 41-yard field goal. But they pulled ahead with QB Ryan Fitzpatrick completing a 33-yard TD pass to WR Lee Evans, followed by kicker Rian Lindell hitting a 21-yard field goal. The lead was increased in the second quarter with Fitzpatrick finding WR Stevie Johnson on a 33-yard TD pass. The Ravens replied with QB Joe Flacco making a 26-yard TD pass to TE Todd Heap. Then Fitzpatrick found Evans again on a 20-yard TD pass to put the Bills up 24–10. The lead was narrowed when Cundiff hit a 48-yard field goal, followed by Flacco throwing a 14-yard TD pass to Heap. In the third quarter the Bills fell behind with Flacco completing a 34-yard TD pass to WR Anquan Boldin, followed by RB Willis McGahee getting a 2-yard TD run. The Bills managed to tie the game in the 4th quarter with Fitzpatrick making a 17-yard TD pass to Evans, and with Lindell getting a 50-yard field goal. After overtime, the decision was made when Cundiff successfully put away a 38-yard field goal to keep the Bills winless after 6 games.

With the loss, the Bills fell to 0–6. After a win by the Carolina Panthers the same week, the Bills became the only team still in contention for an imperfect season.

Week 8: at Kansas City Chiefs

Still looking for a win the Bills flew to Arrowhead Stadium for an AFC duel with the Chiefs. In the First quarter the Bills trailed early as QB Matt Cassel got a 1-yard TD pass to WR Dwayne Bowe. The Bills narrowed the lead in the third quarter with kicker Rian Lindell making a 43-yard field goal. The Chiefs scored with kicker Ryan Succop getting a 28-yard field goal. The Bills responded and tied the game with Ryan Fitzpatrick throwing a 4-yard TD pass to WR Stevie Johnson. At overtime, Succop missed a 38-yarder with 3:38 in the OT. Rian Lindell then kicked a 53-yard field goal, which supposedly would've given the Bills the win, but KC called a timeout. Lindell's second kick hit the right upright and bounced off. The decision was made with Succop successfully hitting a 35-yard field goal with 3 seconds left on the clock to keep the Bills winless after 7 games. And their first 0–7 start since 1984.

Starting offensive tackle Cornell Green was placed on injured reserve to clear a roster spot for linebacker Shawne Merriman, who the Bills picked up on waivers from the San Diego Chargers on November 3.

Week 9: vs. Chicago Bears (Bills Toronto Series)

Still searching for their first win of the season, the Bills flew to the Rogers Centre for their Week 9 interconference duel with the Chicago Bears.  After a scoreless first quarter, Buffalo trailed in the second quarter as Bears quarterback Jay Cutler completed a 4-yard touchdown pass to tight end Greg Olsen.  The Bills answered with quarterback Ryan Fitzpatrick hooked up with wide receiver Roscoe Parrish on a 14-yard touchdown pass.

Chicago retook the lead as running back Chester Taylor got a 1-yard touchdown run.  The Bills responded with a 4-yard touchdown run from running back Fred Jackson (with a blocked extra point).  Buffalo took the lead in the fourth quarter with a 1-yard touchdown run from fullback Corey McIntyre (with a failed two-point conversion), but the Bears got the last laugh with Cutler completing a 2-yard touchdown pass to wide receiver Earl Bennett, along with a two-point conversion pass to running back Matt Forté.

With the loss, the Bills fell to their first 0–8 start since 1984. And became the first team to start out a season 0–8 since the Bengals and Lions in 2008.

Week 10: vs. Detroit Lions

Still on the hunt for their first win of the season the Bills played on home ground for an interconference duel with the Lions. In the 2nd quarter the Bills took the lead after RB Fred Jackson got a 1-yard TD run. In that quarter the Lions only came away with a 25-yard field goal by Dave Rayner. The Bills increased their lead in the third quarter with QB Ryan Fitzpatrick completing a 16-yard TD pass to Jackson. The Lions tried to come back in the 4th quarter with Rayner making a 45-yard field goal and with QB Shaun Hill throwing a 20-yard TD pass to WR Calvin Johnson. The two-point conversion attempt failed, giving the Bills their first victory of the season and eliminating their chances of a winless season.

With the win, the Bills improved to 1–8.

Week 11: at Cincinnati Bengals

After coming away with their first win the Bills flew to Paul Brown Stadium for an AFC duel with the Bengals.  Ryan Fitzpatrick matched his career high with four touchdown passes during Buffalo's biggest comeback in 13 years, and the Bills won their second consecutive game Sunday, 49–31 over the bumbling Cincinnati Bengals. The Bengals (2–8) appeared to be in control after Johnathan Joseph's interception return put them ahead 28–7 in the second quarter. The Bengals' smallest crowd since 2003 saw a vintage collapse. Buffalo (2–8) took advantage of Cincinnati's depleted secondary—Joseph and safety Chris Crocker went out late in the first half—for its biggest comeback since it overcame a 26–0 deficit and topped the Indianapolis Colts 37–35 on Sep 21, 1997, according to STATS LLC. Steve Johnson caught three of the touchdown passes, including an 11-yarder that put Buffalo ahead 35–31 early in the fourth quarter. Johnson finished with eight catches for 137 yards and 3 touchdowns.

With the win, Buffalo improved to 2–8 and are still in postseason contention.

After Week 11, The Buffalo Bills won the GMC Never Say Never Moment of the Week and now are nominated for the Never Say Never moment of the 2010 season.

Week 12: vs. Pittsburgh Steelers

Coming off their win over the Bengals, the Bills went home, donned their throwbacks, and played a Week 13 intraconference duel with the Pittsburgh Steelers. This was head coach Chan Gailey's first time facing the Steelers since leaving team in 1998 to become the new head coach of the Dallas Cowboys. Gailey served as the Steelers' wide receiver coach from 1994 to 1995 and as offensive coordinator from 1996 to 1997. Buffalo trailed early in the first quarter as Steelers running back Rashard Mendenhall got a 1-yard touchdown run.  Pittsburgh added onto their lead in the second quarter with kicker Shaun Suisham getting a 45-yard and a 46-yard field goal.

The Bills answered in the third quarter as quarterback Ryan Fitzpatrick found running back Fred Jackson on a 65-yard touchdown reception.  Buffalo would tie the game in the fourth quarter with a 29-yard and a 32-yard field goal from kicker Rian Lindell.  The Steelers would regain the lead as Suisham made a 48-yard field goal, yet the Bills tied the game again with Lindell's 49-yard field goal. Wide Receiver Stevie Johnson dropped what would have been a 40-yard, game-ending touchdown pass in overtime. However, Pittsburgh got the last laugh in overtime as Suisham booted the game-winning 41-yard field goal.

With the loss, the Bills fell to 2–9 and were eliminated from postseason contention.

Week 13: at Minnesota Vikings

The Bills' twelfth game was an interconference duel with the Vikings. It featured Bills LB Arthur Moats' hit on Vikings QB Brett Favre, which would end the longest streak of quarterback starts in NFL history at 297 games. The Bills took the lead with CB Drayton Florence returning an interception 40 yards for a touchdown. They soon fell behind with Vikings backup QB Tarvaris Jackson throwing a 31-yard TD pass to WR Sidney Rice. Followed in the second quarter by RB Adrian Peterson getting a 2 and a 3-yard TD run. Then Jackson found Rice again on a 6-yard TD pass, followed by kicker Ryan Longwell nailing a 38-yard field goal. They continued to struggle in the fourth quarter when Peterson ran 43 yards to the endzone for a touchdown. The Bills responded with QB Ryan Fitzpatrick getting a 12-yard TD pass to TE David Martin.

With the loss, Buffalo fell to 2–10.

Week 14: vs. Cleveland Browns

Hoping to snap a two-game losing streak the Bills played on home ground for an AFC duel against the Browns. The Bills trailed early as kicker Phil Dawson got a 19-yard field goal, but they took the lead in the second quarter as QB Ryan Fitzpatrick completed an 11-yard TD pass to WR David Nelson. The lead was narrowed when Dawson made a 25-yard field goal, but was expanded after kicker Rian Lindell nailed a 30 and a 19-yard field goal.

With the win, the Bills improved to 3–10.

Week 15: at Miami Dolphins

Coming off their win over the Browns the Bills flew south to Sun Life Stadium for an AFC East rivalry rematch against the Dolphins. The second quarter saw the Bills taking the early advantage with QB Ryan Fitzpatrick completing an 18-yard TD pass to WR David Nelson. This was followed by kicker Rian Lindell nailing a 29-yard field goal. The Dolphins responded with RB Ronnie Brown getting a 6-yard TD run, but the Bills increased their lead in the third quarter with Fitzpatrick throwing a 15-yard TD pass to WR Stevie Johnson. The lead was narrowed in the fourth quarter with QB Chad Henne getting a 9-yard TD pass to WR Brandon Marshall, but the Bills defense was solid enough to hang them on for the win.

With the win, Buffalo improved to 4–10.

Week 16: vs. New England Patriots

Coming off their win over the Dolphins the Bills played an AFC East rivalry rematch against the Patriots. In the first quarter the Bills had the early lead as kicker Rian Lindell hit a 26-yard field goal, but failed to maintain this lead as the Patriots dominated the rest of the game with Danny Woodhead getting a 29-yard TD run, followed by QB Tom Brady completing an 8-yard TD pass to TE Rob Gronkowski, then with kicker Shayne Graham nailing a 34-yard field goal, and with Brady completing a 4 and an 8-yard TD pass to TE Alge Crumpler and to Gronkowski. After that Graham made a 26-yard field goal.

With the loss, the Bills fell to 4–11.

Week 17: at New York Jets

The Bills' final game was a division rivalry rematch against the Jets. The Bills trailed early with kicker Nick Folk making a 28-yard field goal. Their offense struggled as CB Marquice Cole returned an interception 35 yards for a touchdown, which was then followed by QB Mark Brunell making a 17-yard TD pass to WR Santonio Holmes. The Bills made their only score of the game with FS Jairus Byrd returning an interception 37 yards for a touchdown, but they fell further behind after Brunell found WR Braylon Edwards on a 52-yard TD pass. This was followed by QB Kellen Clemens scrambling 10 yards for a touchdown, then with RB John Conner getting a 16-yard TD run.

With the loss, the Bills finish with a 4–12 record.

References

Buffalo
Buffalo Bills seasons
Bills Toronto Series
Buffalo Bills